Santpoort-Zuid or South Santpoort is a village in the municipality of Velsen in the Dutch province of North Holland. It lies to the west of North Haarlem (Schoten). Santpoort-Zuid is bordered by the village of Bloemendaal to the south and the village of Santpoort-Noord to the north. There is a railway station in the village with a connection to Amsterdam Centraal station. The village is an upscale neighborhood with Dutch professionals residing there. It is one of the rare coastal forested areas protected by large dunes.

History
A famous historic site in Santpoort-Zuid is the Ruin of Brederode, as well as the formerly well-maintained Natuurbad, Velserend.

Near the village are the ruins of the 13th-century Brederode Castle.

Railway station
Santpoort-Zuid is served by Santpoort Zuid railway station.

References
 

Populated places in North Holland
Velsen
Articles containing video clips